Neil Townshend (born 29 May 1955) is a British luger. He competed in the men's singles event at the 1980 Winter Olympics.

Townshend was educated at Sutton Valence School.

References

External links
 

1955 births
Living people
British male lugers
Olympic lugers of Great Britain
Lugers at the 1980 Winter Olympics
Place of birth missing (living people)
People educated at Sutton Valence School